The men's pole vault at the 2002 European Athletics Championships were held at the Olympic Stadium on August 8–10.

Medalists

Results

Qualification
Qualification: Qualifying Performance 5.75 (Q) or at least 12 best performers (q) advance to the final.

Group A

Group B

Final

External links
Results

Pole
Pole vault at the European Athletics Championships